Alf Kristian Bruun Jacobsen (14 June 1885 – 29 May 1948) was a Norwegian sailor who competed in the 1920 Summer Olympics. He was a crew member of the Norwegian boat Irene, which won the gold medal in the 8 metre class (1907 rating).

References

External links
Alf Jacobsen's profile at databaseOlympics
Alf Jacobsen's profile at Sports Reference.com

1885 births
1948 deaths
Norwegian male sailors (sport)
Sailors at the 1920 Summer Olympics – 8 Metre
Olympic sailors of Norway
Olympic gold medalists for Norway
Olympic medalists in sailing
Medalists at the 1920 Summer Olympics